Warkworth may refer to

People
John Warkworth
 Baron Warkworth, subsidiary title of the Duke of Northumberland

Places
Australia
Warkworth, New South Wales

Canada
Warkworth, Ontario, Canada

England
Warkworth, Northamptonshire
Warkworth, Northumberland
 Warkworth Castle
 Warkworth Hermitage
 Warkworth railway station

New Zealand
Warkworth, New Zealand
Warkworth Radio Astronomical Observatory (Warkworth Radio Telescope, Warkworth 2 dish ...)